Dungargarh(Hindi) is a Town and a Tehsil (Sub-district) in Bikaner district  in the state of Rajasthan, India. It is situated at 70 km distance from Bikaner City. Dungargarh is located on the Bikaner-Jaipur road (National Highway 11).

Structure 
Dungargarh is a progressive town in Bikaner district of Rajasthan. Surrounded by sand dunes on the four sides created by nature, it appears itself a sightseeing. Its homestead is shaped like a cup and can be seen across from one corner of the city due to the direct paths of the other side and every way makes the intersection. Bikaner - 70 km from Bikaner on Delhi Railway Road and National Highway-11 Is already located Its present population is rural area 241084 and urban 53294 in which there are 153553 of males and 140842 of females. Which are divided into 40 wards of the Municipality Board. At present, there is Mr. Manmal Sharma , and MLA of the area, Shri Girdharilal Mahiya, in the chairmanship of the municipal board.

Transport 
The internal transport system in Dungargarh consists of autorickshaws.  railway comes under Bikaner Division in North Western Railways (NWR) Zone and connected to some of major Indian cities via broad gauge railway. The city has direct rail connections to Delhi, Gurgaon, Bikaner Surat. Rewari, Hisar, Rohatak, Kolkata,Prayagraj,haridwar, Panvel ,Secunderabad ,Coimbatore ,Jaipur, Mathura

Sri Dungargarh is well served with roads and is linked directly to Delhi, Jaipur, Agra, Alwar, Ludhiana, Sri Ganganagar, Bhatinda, Ambala, Haridwar, and many other cities and National highways 11.

People from Dungargarh 
Dungar Singh - Founder of Dungargarh
Vinay Maloo - Founder of Enso Group
Satish Kumar - Indian British Nuclear disarmament advocate, Pacifist, Jain scholar and the editor of Resurgence & Ecologist magazine

References

External links
 Tusi Medical and Research Center
 Sri Dungargarh Prawasi
Sri Dungargarh Assembly constituency

Cities and towns in Bikaner district